William Brewer was a Massachusetts politician who served on the Board of Selectmen of the Town of Roxbury, Massachusetts, as a member of the Massachusetts House of Representatives and from, 1811 to 1812, as the sheriff of Norfolk County, Massachusetts.

Death
Brewer died on August 2, 1817.

References

High Sheriffs of Norfolk County
Members of the Massachusetts House of Representatives
Year of birth missing
1817 deaths